Circle of Life was founded by Julia Butterfly Hill. The US-based organization counts a number of celebrities and west-coast business leaders as supporters, advisors, and backers.

References

External links
 

Environmental organizations based in the United States
Julia Butterfly Hill